The 61st Guards Fighter Aviation Corps was a corps of the Soviet Air Forces from 1949 to 1980. 

It was originally formed on 10 September 1942 as the 1st Fighter Aviation Corps. On 18 March 1943, it became the 1st Guards Fighter Aviation Corps.

In 1945 it had:
3rd Guards Fighter Aviation Division (Ludwigslust, Germany)
4th Guards Fighter Aviation Division (Werder, Germany) (64th, 65th, and 66th Guards Fighter Aviation Regiments, 3 April 1945)

The corps was under the command of General Lieutenant of Aviation E.M. Beletsky.

In June 1945 the 240th Fighter Aviation Division in Oranienburg, Germany, was added to the corps.

The 3rd Guards Fighter Aviation Division left the corps in September 1948.

On 10 January 1949, a decree was issued renaming the formation the 61st Guards Fighter Aviation Corps. This took effect in February 1949. At the same time, its parent formation changed the designation from the 16th to the 24th Air Army.

The 131st Fighter Aviation Division arrived from Poland in October 1949 and joined the corps.

In 1980 the corps was disbanded by being re-designated a mobilization aviation corps.

References

Michael Holm, 61st Guards Fighter Aviation Corps

Corps of the Soviet Union
Units and formations of the Soviet Air Forces
Fighter aircraft units and formations of the Soviet Union
Military units and formations established in 1949
Military units and formations disestablished in 1980